Surrey Crescent Moon is an album released in 2012 by New Zealand band Hello Sailor. It reached number 35 on the New Zealand music charts.

Track listing

Critical reception

Critical reception was generally favourable. Simon Sweetman was the most enthusiastic, calling it "their third best record". Graham Reid of the New Zealand Herald criticised the unevenness of the album, with highlights such the title track and "Big Black Bus" equalled by the low point of "De Dog". However, he noted that even the band's albums considered classics were similarly inconsistent and that when the album "locks into place, that old acidic-but-sentimental magic remains mercifully untarnished."

References

Hello Sailor (band) albums
2012 albums
Albums recorded at Roundhead Studios